Oliver Goldsmith (1794–1861) was a Canadian poet born in St. Andrews, New Brunswick. In 1822 he wrote some verses for an amateur theatre in Halifax. He is best known for The Rising Village, which appeared in 1825. It was at once the first book-length poem published by a native English-Canadian and the first book-length publication in England by a Canadian poet. Furthermore, his Autobiography is the first autobiography of a native Canadian writer. He is not to be confused with his great-uncle Oliver Goldsmith, to whose celebrated poem The Deserted Village The Rising Village is a response.

In 1944 his name was added by the Canadian Government to its list of Persons of National Historic Significance.

See also

Canadian literature
Canadian poetry
List of Canadian poets

References

External links
 The Rising Village by Oliver Goldsmith (full text).
 Other Poems by Oliver Goldsmith
 Kenneth J. Hughes on "The Rising Village"
 David Jackel on "The Rising Village"
 A Short Biography of Oliver Goldsmith
 Department of English, St. Thomas University, at New Brunswick Literature Encyclopedia NBLE
 Goldsmith and the rising village, by D. M. R. Bentley, in "Studies in Canadian Literature", vol. 15, 1, 1990, English or French; University of New Brunswick

19th-century Canadian poets
Canadian male poets
Writers from New Brunswick
1794 births
1861 deaths
Persons of National Historic Significance (Canada)
19th-century Canadian male writers